may refer to:

Places
Tamagawa, Ehime, a former town in Ehime Prefecture that is now part of the city of Imabari, Japan
Tamakawa, Fukushima, a village in Fukushima Prefecture, Japan
Tamagawa, Saitama, a village in Saitama Prefecture, Japan
Tamagawa, Yamaguchi, a town in Yamaguchi Prefecture, Japan
Tama River (in Japanese, 多摩川 Tamagawa) in and near Tokyo, Japan
Tamagawa, Akita, location of Japan's highest flow rate hot spring, the Tamagawa Hot Spring, in Akita Prefecture, Japan

Other uses
Tamagawa (surname)
Tamagawa Station (disambiguation)
Tamagawa Line (disambiguation)
13207 Tamagawa, main-belt asteroid